Cornelio Padilla, Jr. (18 November 1946 – 8 December 2013) was a Filipino cyclist. He competed in the individual road race and team time trial events at the 1964 Summer Olympics.

References

External links
 

1946 births
2013 deaths
Filipino male cyclists
Olympic cyclists of the Philippines
Cyclists at the 1964 Summer Olympics
Sportspeople from Manila
People from Santa Cruz, Manila
Place of birth missing